In the 1856 Iowa State Senate elections, Iowa voters elected state senators to serve in the sixth Iowa General Assembly. Following the expansion of the Iowa Senate from 31 to 36 seats in 1856, elections were held for 21 of the state senate's 36 seats. State senators serve four-year terms in the Iowa State Senate.

The general election took place in 1856.

Following the previous election in 1854, Democrats had control of the Iowa Senate with 17 seats to Whigs' 14 seats. However, three changes occurred during the fifth general assembly. In the first district, Democratic Senator James M. Love resigned on July 1, 1856, causing a vacancy in his seat that was filled by special election. Democrat David Trowbridge Brigham succeeded Senator Love, holding the seat for the Democrats. In the twentieth district, Democratic Senator Theophilus Bryan was originally declared the winner. However, the members of the Iowa Senate voted on January 7, 1855 to remove Senator Bryan and replace him with his Whig opponent, Senator James Cunningham Jordan, thereby flipping the seat to Whig control. In the twenty-fourth district, Democratic Senator John G. Shields died on June 25, 1856, causing a vacancy in his seat. Therefore, by election day in 1856, the Democrats held 15 seats, the Whigs held 15 seats, and one seat was vacant (the seat that had been held by Democratic Senator John Shields).

Prior to the 1856 election, nearly all Whigs switched political party affiliation to become Republicans.

To claim control of the chamber from Democrats, the Republicans needed to garner 19 Senate seats.

Republicans claimed control of the Iowa State Senate following the 1856 general election with the balance of power shifting to Republicans holding 23 seats, Democrats having 12 seats, and a lone seat for the Know Nothing Party (a net gain of 23 seats for Republicans and 1 seat for Know Nothings). This was the first time Democrats lost control of the chamber. Republican Senator William W. Hamilton was chosen as the President of the Iowa Senate for the sixth General Assembly, succeeding Democratic Senator Maturin L. Fisher in that leadership position.

The 1856 general election was the first in which the Iowa Senate's districts expanded to cover all the land area currently recognized as Iowa.

Summary of Results 
 Note: The holdover Senators not up for re-election are not listed on this table.

Source:

Detailed Results
NOTE: The Iowa General Assembly does not provide detailed vote totals for Iowa State Senate elections in 1856.

See also
 Elections in Iowa

External links
District boundaries were redrawn before the 1856 general election for the Iowa Senate:
Iowa Senate Districts 1852-1855 map
Iowa Senate Districts 1856-1859 map

References

Iowa Senate
Iowa
Iowa Senate elections